Taanayel, also transliterated Tanayal, is a village located in the Zahlé District of the Beqaa Governorate in Lebanon.

History
In 1838, Eli Smith noted  Tha'nayil  as a Sunni Muslim village in the Beqaa Valley.

In 1982, Taanayel suffered heavy damages from aerial bombardments.

In October 1985, war planes of the Israeli Air Force (IAF) dropped bombs and fired rockets on a target near Tanayel on the Beirut-Damascus highway. According to UPI, the command of the Israel Defense Forces (IDF) claimed that the place was used as a military base by Ahmed Jibril's pro-Syrian Popular Front for the Liberation of Palestine-General Command.

Tannayal farm (from the Aramaic word for "the Grace of God") lies a few kilometers south from Chtaura on the main road.  An estate that has been converted to a farm and retreat centre in Ignatian spirituality, owned by the Jesuit fathers since 1860. Exotic fowl including peacocks and doves can be found there. It is a working farm and also serves as a teaching facility for the Faculty of Agriculture at Saint Joseph University located in Beirut.

References

Bibliography

External links
Taanayel, localiban
Deir Taanayel, Jesuit blog

Populated places in Zahlé District
Sunni Muslim communities in Lebanon